All Their Best is the first compilation album, third album release overall, by German Eurodance group Fun Factory. It was released in 1996 and features 17 tracks. On 20 March 2006, to celebrate the 10th anniversary of this release, Form Records re-released the compilation album with an altered cover art, but same track list except plus two bonus remixes, retitled 10th Anniversary Greatest Hits.

Track listing

All Their Best
 Celebration (radio party vocal)
 Don't Go Away (Radio Walk)
 Doh Wah Diddy (Dee Dee Radio)
 I Wanna B With U (B On The Air rap)
 I Love You (album version)
 Pain (Feel The Pain mix)
 Close to You (Trouble mix)
 Oh Yeah Yeah (I Like It)
 Prove Your Love
 Love of My Life
 Groove Me (album version)
 Take Your Chance (Take The Airwaves mix)
 Fun Factory's Theme
 Doh Wah Diddy (Doh Wah NRG-remix)
 Celebration (Slam rap extended)
 I Wanna B With U (Homegirls International remix)
 Freestylin'

10th Anniversary Greatest Hits
 Celebration (radio party vocal)
 Don't Go Away (Radio Walk)
 Doh Wah Diddy (Dee Dee Radio)
 I Wanna B With U (B On The Air rap)
 I Love You (album version)
 Pain (Feel The Pain mix)
 Close to You (Trouble mix)
 Oh Yeah Yeah (I Like It)
 Prove Your Love
 Love of My Life
 Groove Me (album version)
 Take Your Chance (Take The Airwaves mix)
 Fun Factory's Theme
 Doh Wah Diddy (Doh Wah NRG-remix)
 Celebration (Slam rap extended)
 I Wanna B With U (Homegirls International remix)
 Freestylin'
 Close to You (Close To Ragga remix)
 I Love You (short edit)

Sources
 Discogs

References

1996 compilation albums
Fun Factory (band) albums